Next Move (1947–1968) was an American Thoroughbred Champion racehorse.

Background
Next Move was bred and raced by prominent horseman Alfred G. Vanderbilt II She was sired by Calumet Farm's stallion Bull Lea. Her dam was Vanderbilt 's Now What, a multiple stakes winner and the 1939 American Champion Two-Year-Old Filly whose sire was Chance Play, the 1927 American Horse of the Year.

She was trained by future U.S. Racing Hall of Fame trainer Bill Winfrey.

Racing career
At age three Next Move won eight important stakes races at tracks on both the East and West Coast of the United States en route to being voted American Champion Three-Year-Old Filly honors. Notably, in a race against colts, she finished second to future Hall of Fame inductee Hill Prince in the Sunset Handicap at Hollywood Park Racetrack.

At age four, Next Move did not enjoy the same success as she had at age three. However, she won the Las Flores Handicap at California's Santa Anita Park and at the same track ran second against her male counterparts in California's richest race, the Santa Anita Handicap. Racing at age five in 1952, Next Move had another outstanding campaign and was American Champion Older Female Horse by the Thoroughbred Racing Association. The Daily Racing Form's rival award for Champion Female Handicap horse was won by the three-year-old Real Delight.

Breeding record
Next Move was retired to broodmare duty at Vanderbilt's Sagamore Farm in Glyndon, Maryland. She had five foals by Vanderbilt's Hall of Fame stallion Native Dancer and one by Turn-To. The most successful of her offspring on the track was the filly Good Move, winner of the 1960 Spinaway Stakes and in a Laurel Park Racecourse record time, the Selima Stakes.

References
 Next Move's pedigree and partial racing stats

1947 racehorse births
1968 racehorse deaths
Racehorses bred in Maryland
Racehorses trained in the United States
American Champion racehorses
Thoroughbred family 20